General Sir Walter Mervyn St George Kirke,  (19 January 1877 – 2 September 1949) was the Commander in Chief of the British Home Forces during the Second World War.

Military career
Born the second son of Colonel St. George Mervyn Kirke of the Royal Engineers and his wife Sarah, Walter Kirke was commissioned into the Royal Artillery as a second lieutenant on 21 September 1896. He was promoted to lieutenant on 21 September 1899, and to captain on 4 December 1901 while serving in Waziristan on the North West Frontier of India between 1901 and 1902. From July 1902 he was seconded for service with the Burma Military Police.

Kirke was instrumental in creating the Army's Intelligence Corps in 1907, and he worked for Colonel George Macdonogh in the War Office's Intelligence Department.  This area of work comprised special duties, such as protective security, ciphers and censorship of post (news) and telegraphs.  Starting October 1, 1909, the new Secret Service Bureau (MI5) was created and fell under Macdonogh's supervision.  Here, Kirke came to know Major Vernon Kell (headed up counter-espionage) and Captain Mansfield Cumming (enemy intelligence). Together, Cumming and Kell formed the two halves of MI5.  Macdonogh and Kirke travelled to France and spent two weeks on a walking tour of the French and Belgium borders, visiting areas that looked vulnerable to a German attack. On August 12, 1914, the Intelligence Corps crossed the English Channel, near Le Havre, France as part of the deployment of the B.E.F.

He served in the First World War as a General Staff Officer at GHQ in France and Belgium. In 1916 he learned that German soldiers were intercepting British field telephone conversations and acted to secure them. On March 23, 1918, Kirke was flown in from the front to brief the War Cabinet in London on Operation Michael. In late 1918 he became deputy director of Military Operations at the War Office and was then moved to Aldershot in 1922. In 1924 he was appointed Head of the British Military Mission to Finland and in 1925 President of Inter-Allied Commission of Investigation for Hungary.

Then in 1926 he became Deputy Chief of the General Staff for India moving on to be General Officer Commanding 5th Division in 1929. In 1933 he was appointed General Officer Commanding-in-Chief for Western Command and in 1936 he became Director-General of the Territorial Army.

He served in the Second World War initially as Inspector-General of Home Defence and then as Commander-in-Chief, Home Forces. in that role he always thought that the threat of a German invasion was exaggerated. He retired in 1940.

He was also an Aide-de-Camp General to the King from 1937 to 1940.

References

External links 

 The Daily Telegraph (London): Link
 Internet Archive: (sign up to view source material for footnotes), Link
 Journal of Intelligence History, Link
 Judd, Alan, "The Quest for C: Sir Mansfield Cumming and The Founding of the Secret Service", London, HarperCollins, 1999
 The Liddell Hart Centre for Military Archives: Link
 The London Gazette, Link
 Mackenzie, S.P., The Home Guard: A Military and Political History, Oxford: Oxford University Press, 1995
 UK National Archives, Link

Further reading
 Private Papers of General Sir Walter Kirke GCB CMG DSO can be found in the Imperial War Museum, Documents and Sound section, ref: Documents.20171 (82/28/1 & Con Shelf).
 Service Record: Link
 Organization of Military Intelligence (MI) Sections During World War I: Link 

|-
 

1877 births
1949 deaths
People from Portsmouth
Military personnel from Portsmouth
British Army generals
Royal Artillery officers
British Army personnel of World War I
British Army generals of World War II
Knights Grand Cross of the Order of the Bath
Companions of the Order of St Michael and St George
Companions of the Distinguished Service Order